"My Father's Shoes" is a song released in 1992 by the band Level 42 with the label RCA. It was released in only two countries: United Kingdom and Spain.

The video clip is the last video of Level 42 to feature of Jakko Jakszyk and Gary Husband. Jakko left the band in 1992, but came back in 1994 for the last Level 42 tour prior to  the disband. Gary Husband left the band in 1992, but came back in 1994 in the reform of the group and stayed in the group until the present day, and recorded the studio album Retroglide. The song peaked at #55 on the UK Singles Chart in 1992.

Personnel
Mark King - Bass/Vocals/Guitars
Mike Lindup - Keyboards/Vocals
Gary Husband - Drums
Plus
Wally Badarou - Keyboards
Dominic Miller - Guitars

References

1992 singles
Level 42 songs
Songs written by Mark King (musician)
Songs written by Mike Lindup
1991 songs
RCA Records singles
Songs written by Wally Badarou